Lundy's Restaurant, also known as Lundy Brothers Restaurant, was an American seafood restaurant in the Sheepshead Bay neighborhood of Brooklyn, New York City, along the bay of the same name. Lundy's was founded in 1926 by Irving Lundy as a restaurant on the waterfront of Sheepshead Bay; five years later, the original building was condemned to make way for a redevelopment of the bay. The present building opened in 1934 or 1935, and closed in 1979. Another restaurant operated in the Lundy's building from 1997 to early 2007, after which the building was converted into a shopping center.

Lundy's, the last of the many seafood restaurants that once lined Sheepshead Bay, was well known for its cuisine and was among the largest restaurants in the United States upon its completion, with between 2,400 and 2,800 seats. At its peak, Lundy's served a million patrons annually.

The building, designated by the New York City Landmarks Preservation Commission as an official city landmark, was designed by architects Bloch & Hesse in the Spanish Colonial Revival style. The building's distinguishing features include its multiple tiers of red-tile roofs, its leadlight windows, and decorative ironwork, a style of architecture that is used on few other buildings in the New York metropolitan area.

History

Founding 
Lundy's was founded by Sheepshead Bay native Frederick William Irving Lundy ( 1895 – 1977; popularly known as "Irving"). Irving Lundy was the oldest of seven; his father Fred was a prominent figure in the Brooklyn Democratic Party. Several of Irving's male relatives, including his father, operated the successful Lundy Brothers fish market, which by the early 1880s sold fish, clams, and oysters wholesale at their shops in Coney Island and Sheepshead Bay. According to a 1902 biography of the Lundys, they were also selling seafood in Manhattan Beach by then.

At the turn of the 20th century, Irving Lundy started a business selling clams out of a pushcart. By 1907, he had opened a clam bar built on stilts over Sheepshead Bay. By the time he was 16, Lundy claimed to be employing several workers. Then, during World War I, he joined the United States Navy. Irving Lundy's brothers Clayton and Stanley died in January 1920 in a boating accident while tending the family's clam beds in Jamaica Bay.

In 1923 Irving would buy the pier for the original restaurant, located between East 21st Street and Ocean Avenue. The site had been previously operated by Henrietta Sheirr, who had operated the pier as a restaurant since 1906, initially operating with two tables; at the time, only one other seafood restaurant existed in the area. Sheirr's eatery had expanded to accommodate 235 patrons by the time Lundy purchased the pier. In 1926, Lundy would close the pier in lieu of operating the restaurant. The restaurant was decorated with the letters "F.W.I.L.," standing for "Frederick William Irving Lundy". Irving's surviving brother Allen and their three sisters would manage the restaurant. The same year, Irving Lundy was kidnapped and the restaurant was burglarized in an armed robbery, though Irving escaped relatively unharmed.

Relocation 

With the development of the Sheepshead Bay community into a residential neighborhood, there were efforts to improve the facilities on the waterfront. This would make Sheepshead Bay into what the Brooklyn Daily Eagle described as a "modern Venice". Since the Sheepshead Bay development would entail the destruction of the original Lundy's location, Irving Lundy decided to rebuild his restaurant at 1901 Emmons Avenue, on the road's northern sidewalk, at the site of the Bayside Hotel and Casino. Lundy commissioned architects Ben Bloch and Walter Hesse to design the new building. By March 1932, his attorney said that "Lundy's would establish a $600,000 restaurant on the north side of Emmons Avenue as soon as the razing of the waterfront structures gets underway."

In 1931, the city condemned several buildings on the bay shore, including the original Lundy's, to widen Emmons Avenue. The Great Depression delayed further progress, as these buildings would not be destroyed until mid-1934, and construction started on new buildings on Emmons Avenue's northern sidewalk. To avoid excessive disruption to normal business, Lundy waited until the last minute to close his original restaurant. A contemporary account stated that the relocation was timed such that when the new building was opened just in time for "the shucking of the last clam in the old place." Demolition was underway by April 1934. Herb Shalat, who became a partner at Bloch & Hesse several decades later, said that "Bloch and Hesse and staff would work at all hours and bring complete or even incomplete design drawings and details to the site each morning during the building process supervised by Walter Hesse, Piero Ghiani [an architect with Bloch & Hesse] and Irving Lundy." Lundy would continue to retain Bloch & Hesse for his other Sheepshead Bay projects through the 1970s.

The new building opened in 1934 or 1935. In 1935, shortly after Lundy's opened, the federal government threatened to seize the restaurant because Irving Lundy had not paid taxes on liquor that he stored in the restaurant. After a federal raid and a brief closure in June 1935, a judge sympathetic to Lundy ordered an injunction against the federal government's proposal to dismantle the bar at Lundy's. That October, Lundy agreed to pay back taxes. In 1937, part of the ceiling collapsed, injuring five diners. The one-story Teresa Brewer Room along Ocean Avenue was constructed in 1945; it was named after the pop singer Lundy's nephew had married. Around this time, air conditioning was added, and two years later, Walter Hesse enclosed the patios on the second floor.

With the success of Lundy's Restaurant, Irving Lundy was able to buy waterfront real estate along Sheepshead Bay. In some cases, he bought the enterprises of rival restaurateurs. At one point, his holdings included all of the 70 waterfront properties on Emmons Avenue from East 19th to East 29th Streets. Lundy never resold his properties, but rather, leased them to businesspeople that he liked. He never married and became a recluse in his later life. Because of his reclusive behavior and his wealth, Lundy became known as the "Howard Hughes of Brooklyn".

The first labor strike in Lundy's history occurred in 1946 when waiters walked out due to union disagreements. A larger strike started in 1957 over disputes regarding wages. During the second strike, Irving Lundy said that he would permanently shutter the restaurant if the waiters did not stop striking. In July of that year, a few days after the strike started, he officially announced that Lundy's would "never reopen" due to the strike. Despite a report in September 1957 that Lundy's would reopen imminently after personnel changes, much of the restaurant except for the clam bar remained closed until a labor agreement was reached that December. The restaurant was briefly closed again in 1968 due to a seafood shortage.

Closure 
By the 1970s Lundy's was facing numerous problems, including two armed robberies in 1972 and 1974, a temporary closure following an unfavorable health-inspection report in 1973, and the murder of one of the Lundy siblings in 1975. Irving Lundy died in September 1977, and a fire destroyed Lundy's that same November. After Irving Lundy's death, his $25 million estate was distributed among a niece and three nephews. Under subsequent management, Lundy's Restaurant started to lose money, making it financially unsustainable. Changes were also occurring in the surrounding community; while Sheepshead Bay did not undergo the white flight and high crime that afflicted other New York City neighborhoods, the waterfront economy was dependent on the success of Lundy's.

Following disputes among the last surviving Lundy siblings, Lundy's closed in October 1979, with a sign stating that Lundy's was "Closed for Renovations". The Lundy's Restaurant building was sold to investment company Litas Group in 1981 for $11 million. The new owners wished to build a high-rise residential development with condominiums, a nightclub, a hotel, and specialty shops on the nearly  site. The building soon became dilapidated and filled with graffiti, and in turn, other stores in Sheepshead Bay closed due to a general decline in visitors.

The Sheepshead Bay Beautification Group's co-director Peter Romeo, who thought that Lundy's affected economic development along Sheepshead Bay, started lobbying for Lundy's to be restored. Romeo covered the graffiti on the exterior with murals and looked for developers to purchase, maintain, and restore the building. Further efforts resulted in the New York City Landmarks Preservation Commission designating the building an official city landmark in March 1992. This action was supported by the Seaside Restaurant Development Corporation, which owned the building and supported the landmark designation. The owners started looking for $10 million in financing. At that point, the restaurant's reopening had been proposed unsuccessfully at least 12 times.

Reopening 
Lundy's was acquired in the early 1990s by the publicly traded TAM Restaurant Group, which in 1996 reopened it as a smaller venue in the same location. Restaurateurs Frank and Jeanne Cretella, who The New York Times reported had "helped revive Lundy's", headed the TAM Restaurant Group and also managed the Boathouse Cafe at Loeb Boathouse in Central Park. The second iteration of Lundy's only occupied about half of the space taken up by the original eatery. Nonetheless, the opening of the new Lundy's location spurred a wave of development on Emmons Avenue. By March 1996, property owners reported that real estate prices had doubled and that vacant apartments were being occupied. Formerly vacant lots were being developed and new restaurants and other businesses were being opened along Emmons Avenue, including two shopping plazas and a sports bar. Lundy's itself saw waiting lists of up to one month long for weekend reservations, and it received an influx of calls inquiring as to whether the restaurant had truly reopened. Despite its relative remoteness, Lundy's was popular, with patrons coming from as far as eastern Long Island.

By 1998 there was also a Japanese restaurant at the site of the original Lundy's, while the retail space was unused and being converted into office space. The unused space later became Lundy's Landing Shopping Plaza, though the shopping space was initially unsuccessful. The new owners of Lundy's opened a branch location in 2001, at 205 West 50th Street near Manhattan's Times Square, but it lasted only a short time. Lundy's was nearly seized by the New York state government in 2003 due to non-payment of taxes, though this was quickly resolved after back taxes were paid. In December 2004, a family-owned business named The Players Club, headed by restaurateur Afrodite Dimitroulakos, announced it had acquired Lundy's from the TAM Restaurant Group.

Lundy's again closed down in January 2007 when the landlord locked the owners out. The former space of the second Lundy's was renovated and incorporated into Lundy's Landing Shopping Plaza, hosting several restaurants and businesses. The renovation was controversial, as neighborhood residents felt that the new occupants of the Lundy's location, the Russian-themed Cherry Hill Gourmet Market, were radically altering the space. Further, in 2011 the city found that the market was theoretically in violation of local zoning ordinance, since Lundy's fell within a special waterfront zoning district that prohibited certain commercial uses. At the time, the remaining space was occupied by Turkish and Japanese restaurants.

In the aftermath of Hurricane Sandy in October 2012, the waters of Sheepshead Bay overflowed. The storm surge flooded the Cherry Hill Gourmet Market at ground level, causing it to sustain water damage and resulting in tons of spoiled food. During the post-hurricane cleanup the food had to be discarded, but the building was otherwise unaffected. The front of Masal's Cafe looking out on Sheepshead Bay at Lundy's Landing Shopping Plaza shows the high height of the water level entering the Lundy's structure at the peak of Hurricane Sandy. In 2015, a seafood restaurant named Cipura moved into the western side of the former Lundy's building.

Architecture 
The Lundy's restaurant building was designed in the Spanish Colonial Revival style by Bloch & Hesse. The architects had to make the building large enough to be appealing to patrons while also blending in with the seaside-resort and "modern Venice" designs of Sheepshead Bay. The entire city block occupied by Lundy's measured  on its southern side (along Emmons Avenue) and  along its western and eastern sides (along East 19th Street and Ocean Avenue, respectively).  The structure has a mostly rectangular footprint, except at its northwestern corner, where it incorporates part of the -story Bayside Hotel on East 19th Street.

Lundy's contained numerous spaces including indoor and outdoor dining, clam and liquor bars, kitchens, storage, a salesmen's waiting room, restrooms, offices, and a staff lounge. The former Bayside Hotel contained the offices, lounge, waiting rooms, and storage, while the one-story wing on Ocean Avenue contained the bars.

Main building 
The primary structure comprising Lundy's is a two-story Spanish Colonial Revival structure, newly built by Bloch & Hesse. Its facade contained large windows that could be opened to let in air; there was no air conditioning at the time of the restaurant's construction, and the windows also provided views of the bay. Specific elements in the Spanish Colonial Revival style included its stucco walls, sloping mission-tiled roofs, an arcade on the second story, a large chimney, tiled gateways, ornate entrance pavilions, and detailing such as wooden lintels and grills at each of the entrances along Emmons Avenue. At the time of the building's construction, the Mediterranean style was commonly used at seaside resorts, so the use of the Spanish Colonial Revival style at Lundy's would have made it seem like a seaside resort.

The southern facade along Emmons Avenue serves as the main facade for the building. Along that side, there is an enclosed second story that is slightly set back from the first story below. The windows on both floors are composed of large casement windows, designed at a time where air-conditioning was nonexistent. The Emmons Avenue facade contains twenty-one bays and two pavilions with hip roofs; the ground-floor bays are separated by pilasters. The entrance bays originally contained wood-and-glass doors with seafood-themed carvings, as well as glass fanlights that contained depictions of seahorses and crabs. Raised lettering with the words  is located above the entrance bays. The other bays contain projecting stone window sills.

The second story has rectangular window openings that are wider and shorter than the corresponding windows on the ground floor, as well as groups of three ocular window openings above each of the entrance pavilions. The rectangular windows are composed of three vertical sections: a decorated center section and transparent top and bottom sections. The second floor's enclosed porches are covered by a red corrugated sheet metal roof. The portion of the second story above the entrance pavilions is also enclosed.

The northern or rear facade contains two sections: a kitchen wing on the western side (adjacent to the Bayside Hotel annex on the northwestern corner of the building), and a dining room wing on the eastern side. The ground floor of the kitchen wing contained the kitchens and included four long, horizontal bays for window openings, while the second floor was an extension of the dining area there, with stucco walls and casement windows. On the dining room wing, there are two pavilions with ocular windows extending from the second floor, between which is an enclosed porch with casement windows.

Ancillary structures 
The Bayside Hotel was incorporated onto the western portion of the building. In 1934 it was redesigned with a stucco facade and Spanish Colonial Revival elements to maintain a continuous design with the new structure. The former hotel is physically separated from the main building by a private alley. At ground level, the western facade of the structure (facing East 19th Street) is composed of four bays with a doorway at the southernmost bay.  The second and third levels contain six windows each: two windows that correspond to the southernmost ground-level bay, and four corresponding to the remaining three bays. In the renovation, the hotel structure's original windows were expanded, and on the back facade, an exterior stairway was built to provide access to the second floor.

The Ocean Avenue side of the restaurant was a separate one-story wing that housed the liquor and clam bars, and was expanded to two stories in 1947. The Ocean Avenue facade has eight bays. Both of the end bays contain entrance pavilions with gable roofs and arched entrances. The six center bays are simpler in design, similar to those on the Emmons Avenue side, though the southernmost of these intermediate bays also contains a doorway. The second story design is similar to that of the second-story porches along Emmons Avenue.

In 1945, the one-story Teresa Brewer Room was erected on the Ocean Avenue side of the building. The room is a one-story log-and-stucco-faced frame structure, with a mosaic war memorial facing Ocean Avenue.

Service 

Lundy's in its heyday was reported to be one of the largest restaurants in the United States. According to various reports, it seated 2,400, 2,800, or 3,000 patrons. Half of the seats were on the ground floor and the other half were on the second floor. The 1996 version seated 700–800. According to a New York City Landmarks Preservation Commission report, on a regular weekday Lundy's could seat 2,000 patrons, and on a typical Saturday, it could accommodate 10,000 customers. On particularly busy days such as Mother's Day, over 15,000 people could be served at Lundy's. However, the fifth edition of the AIA Guide to New York City states that on busy days, Lundy's only served up to 5,000 meals a day.

Most of the waiters were African-American, due to Irving Lundy's insistence on hiring African Americans to induce a "southern" feeling. This contrasted with the surrounding neighborhoods, which were largely European-American. In the mid-1950s Lundy's employed up to 385 staff, including cooks, bar staff, and waitstaff. Accounts provided by waiters demonstrated a hectic workplace; waitstaff often worked 12-to-14-hour shifts, and Irving Lundy was known to fire staff for the smallest infractions.

Heyday dining at Lundy's was different than from most other restaurants. The restaurant did not provide hosts for seating and reservations were not taken. Arriving diners would spread out throughout the expanse to search for empty or about-to-be-vacated tables, which sometimes resulted in arguments between patrons. Other unusual rituals of Lundy's included the "lobster bibs" which Lundy had invented for diners to wear, and at the end of each meal, diners were given a bowl of water with which to rinse their fingers.

Cuisine 
Lundy's menu included several food choices. According to The Village Voice, "Favorite dishes included raw clams on the half shell, small buttered biscuits, tomato salads, corn on the cob, shore dinner, Manhattan clam chowder, and huckleberry pie served with Breyers ice cream." Other popular menu items included lobster, oyster, shrimp, fresh fish, chicken, steak, and ice cream. Many diners reportedly came solely for the small buttered biscuits, which became a staple of Lundy's. Another popular dish was the "shore dinner", a dish that offered shrimp, steamed clams, potatoes, vegetables, a crab or oyster cocktail, halves of a lobster and a chicken, coffee, and dessert, which cost US$5 immediately after World War II.

The revived version of Lundy's offered both traditional seafood and newer Italian, meat, and poultry cuisine. The new restaurant included a dozen different varieties of lobsters, which were stored in a  holding tank until just before the guest was about to eat it. Guests were allowed to take the identification tag on the lobster as a souvenir. The Brooklyn-born chef Neil Kleinberg curated the rest of the menu, which included clam chowder, fried shrimp, and three tiers of shore dinners. Under Kleinberg's management, all of the food was baked on the premises, and even included a wood-fired oven for baking pizza.

Reception 
Food critic Mimi Sheraton wrote that her favorite dishes included the "Huckleberry pie (not blueberry), biscuits and Manhattan clam chowder". Columnist James Brady stated that he remembered "being taken by my father to Lundy's on a Sunday morning after church when he would stand at the clam bar and eat a dozen clams or oysters and I nibbled those little crackers they called Oysterettes." Playwright Wendy Wasserstein said of Mother's Day peak periods in the mid-1950s: "Waiters shoved by with plates piled high with steamers and lobster tails and my brother and I tossed hot biscuits." Author Elliot Willensky described Lundy's in the first edition of the AIA Guide to New York City as being "big, brash, noisy, crowded .... [and] a special treat for anyone in New York." After Irving Lundy died, in 1978 Stan Ginsberg of New York magazine wrote that Lundy's was "the most famous and most popular restaurant on the bay", praising its ambiance with "movie-set Moorish with tables and chairs".

See also

 List of restaurants in New York City
 List of seafood restaurants
 List of New York City Designated Landmarks in Brooklyn

References

Notes

Citations

Sources

External links
  (from archive.org; official site now removed)

Restaurants in Brooklyn
Clams
Defunct restaurants in New York City
New York City Designated Landmarks in Brooklyn
Restaurants established in 1934
Restaurants established in 1995
Seafood restaurants in the United States
Sheepshead Bay, Brooklyn
1934 establishments in New York City
1995 establishments in New York City
2007 disestablishments in New York (state)
Defunct seafood restaurants in the United States